Hans Eric Ekounga (born 24 February 1977) is a former Cameroonian football player. In some sources his birth year is listed as 1981, which would make him 17 years old at the time of his debut in the Russian Football Premier League.

Ekounga began playing football with Océan de Kribi before joining Dynamo de Douala. He was the leading goal-scorer in the 2002 Cameroonian Premier League with Coton Sport FC de Garoua, prompting a move to Canon Yaoundé in 2003, and ultimately to Belgian First Division side Sporting Lokeren later that year.

References

1977 births
Living people
Cameroonian footballers
FC Chernomorets Novorossiysk players
Russian Premier League players
Cameroonian expatriate footballers
Expatriate footballers in Russia
Coton Sport FC de Garoua players
Canon Yaoundé players
K.S.C. Lokeren Oost-Vlaanderen players
Belgian Pro League players
Expatriate footballers in Belgium
Olympique Alès players
Expatriate footballers in France
AS Béziers (2007) players
Elite One players
Association football forwards